Shobhna's 7 Nights is a 2012 Indian film directed by Sudipto Chattopadhyaya. The film stars Raveena Tandon and Rohit Roy. Tandon plays the title role of author and socialite who engages in an affair with a younger Bollywood actor. The film won Raveena tandon the Best Actress Award at the Indian Film Festival of Houston.

Cast 
 Raveena Tandon as Shobhna
 Rohit Roy as Amar
 Nataliya Kozhenova as Alex
 Amit Purohit as Saahil
 Lillete Dubey as Malishka
 Anupam Kher as Davidar
 Bharat Kaul as Chattopadhyay

Production
Tandon was the first choice for the part, which she initially turned down as it was too bold. Her part was said to be based on Shobhaa De. Tandon later accepted the part and called it "very contrary to the cliched Hindi film heroine. It's bold in its character and has no justifications". She appeared in a Sufi song. According to Sudipto, "Raveena's character 'Shobhana 7 nights' bears a close resemblance to some of the high society authors and columnists in Mumbai and is bold and sensual, sure to raise eyebrows."

Release
The film was screened at several award festivals, including the Indian Festival of Houston, where Tandon won a special recognition trophy for Outstanding Performance. The film did not have a theatrical release.

References

External links 
 
 

Unreleased Hindi-language films